"Panic" is a song by American rock band From Ashes to New. It was their first single off of their third studio album Panic. It peaked on the Billboard Hard Rock Digital Song Sales chart at number 7 in May 2020, and at 11 on the Billboard Mainstream Rock Songs chart in 2020.

Background
"Panic" was the first single released from From Ashes to New's third studio album, Panic. The song was released on April 17, 2020, and accumulated over 1.5 million streams in under a month. The song features the same lineup as their prior album, The Future, something the band felt was a strength in their favor in recording, as the band had been through multiple difficult lineup changes prior. The band returned to working with music producer Colin Brittain on the track as well, because the band had been happy in working with on the prior album on the track "Nowhere to Run", and worked with producer Erik Ron, known for working with Godsmack, because they felt he would help the song's quiet-loud dynamic. A music video for the track was also release; production for it was very difficult due to it occurring during the beginning of the COVID-19 pandemic. Band member Matt Brandyberry described it as a "race against the clock" and a "The Book of Eli" type situation to make, with crew members constantly leaving in order to self-quarantine, and local restaurants and hotels closing down to the public. The video was just finished before the state of New York was shutdown.

Themes and composition
Metal Injection described the song as "a song about dealing with anxiety" that "became an emotional anthem for what we are all going through", in reference to the COVID-19 pandemic.

Personnel
Band
 Danny Case – lead vocals 
 Matt Brandyberry – rap vocals, keyboards, rhythm guitar, bass
 Lance Dowdle – lead guitar, bass
 Mat Madiro – drums

Production
Colin Brittain – producer

Charts

References

2020 singles
2020 songs
From Ashes to New songs
Songs written by Erik Ron
Eleven Seven Label Group singles
Songs about the COVID-19 pandemic
Songs about mental health